The 1893 Liverpool West Derby by-election was held on 10 January 1893 after the death of the incumbent Conservative MP William Henry Cross.  It was retained by the Conservative candidate Walter Hume Long.

References

1893 elections in the United Kingdom
West Derby, 1893
1893 in England
1890s in Liverpool